Plantago lanceolata is a species of flowering plant in the plantain family Plantaginaceae. It is known by the common names ribwort plantain, narrowleaf plantain, English plantain, ribleaf, lamb's tongue, and buckhorn. It is a common weed on cultivated or disturbed land.

Description

The plant is a rosette-forming perennial herb, with leafless, silky, hairy flower stems. The basal leaves are lanceolate spreading or erect, scarcely toothed with 3-5 strong parallel veins narrowed to a short petiole. The flower stalk is deeply furrowed, ending in an ovoid inflorescence of many small flowers each with a pointed bract. Each inflorescence can produce up to two hundred seeds. It is native to temperate Eurasia, widespread throughout the British Isles, but scarce on the most acidic soils (pH < 4.5). It is present and widespread in the Americas and Australia as an introduced species.

Distribution
Plantago lanceolata is native to Eurasia, but has been introduced to North America and many other parts of the world with suitable habitats.

History

Considered to be an indicator of agriculture in pollen diagrams, P. lanceolata has been found in western Norway from the Early Neolithic onwards, which is considered an indicator of grazing in that area at the time. This would make sense, as P. lanceolata thrives in open fields where livestock are frequently disturbing the ground.

Uses
Plantago lanceolata is used frequently in herbal teas and other herbal remedies.
A tea from the leaves is used as a cough medicine. In the traditional Austrian medicine Plantago lanceolata leaves have been used internally (as syrup or tea) or externally (fresh leaves) for treatment of disorders of the respiratory tract, skin, insect bites, and infections. The leaves can be eaten when very young.

Songbirds eat the seeds, and the leaves are eaten by rabbits.

Chemistry
Plantago lanceolata contains phenylethanoids such as acteoside (verbascoside), cistanoside F, lavandulifolioside, plantamajoside and isoacteoside. It also contains the iridoid glycosides aucubin and catalpol. These iridoid glycosides make the plant inedible to some herbivores, but others are unperturbed by them—for example, the buckeye butterfly Junonia coenia, whose larvae eat the leaves of P. lanceolata and ingest the iridoid glycosides to make themselves unpalatable to predators.

Habitat
Plantago lanceolata can live anywhere from very dry meadows to places similar to a rain forest, but it does best in open, disturbed areas. It is therefore common near roadsides where other plants cannot flourish; it grows tall if it can do so, but in frequently-mowed areas it adopts a flat growth habit instead. Historically, the plant has thrived in areas where ungulates graze and turn up the earth with their hooves.

Reproduction
The mode of reproduction can vary among populations of P. lanceolata. Reproduction occurs sexually, with the pollen being wind dispersed for the most part, though the plant is occasionally pollinated by bees. P. lanceolata cannot reproduce asexually in the way that many other species of Plantago can; instead, it is an obligate outcrosser.

Enemies

Insect predation 
Plantago lanceolata is host to many different species of the order Lepidoptera. Species such as Junonia coenia, Spilosoma congrua, and Melitaea cinxia lay their eggs on P. lanceolata plants so they can serve as a food source for the larvae when they hatch. The iridoid glycosides in the plant leaves accumulate in the caterpillars and make them unpalatable to predators.

Infection by powdery mildew
Podosphaera plantaginis is a powdery mildew fungus that infects P. lanceolata. All of the P. lanceolata populations are infected by several strains of this powdery mildew fungus. Once the populations are infected, the symptoms are minimal at first. Then, after a few weeks or months lesions start to appear covering the entire surface of the leaves and the stem, making it very noticeable. Another species that infects P. lanceolata is Golovinomyces sordidus. Both of these mildews are obligate biotrophs, meaning that they can only infect living tissue. They cover the surface of the leaves and extend hyphae into the cell matrix in order to extract nutrients.

Resistance to powdery mildew
After the populations are infected, they react in different ways. Some populations of P. lanceolata are more susceptible to different strains of powdery mildew. Also, some populations have multiple resistance phenotypes where on the other hand, others may only have one resistance phenotype.
Overall, the populations that have the highest variety of resistance phenotypes will have the highest survival rates particularly when rates of infection are high.

In popular culture
Children use the plant in a game where the flower's head is "shot" off the end of stalk; it has alternately been called "1 o'clock gun", "rifle", among others names. To play the game, one would pluck a stalk and wrap a loop of the distal end of the stem around the section of stem closest to the flower's head. The loop is tightened so it stops up behind the flower's head and the stem is pulled backward until the flower head pops off. The stalk is slightly elastic so when the flower head separates, it (the head) flies off in the direction the stalk is pointed like a gun, hence the gun-related names given to it. 

In Edinburgh, Scotland this game is called ‘The 1 o’clock gun’ after the gun that fires everyday from Edinburgh Castle. Writer Sean Michael Wilson notes that: "When I was a kid in Edinburgh we used it for a cute wee game called ‘The 1 o’clock gun’ - we twisted the stalk around into a kind of noose, quickly pulled it (with the left hand pulling back sharply and the right hand moving forward) and then the head of the stalk would go shooting off. Piitttt!! We used to see how far we could get it to go - great fun." In the West Country of England the same game is called 'cannonballs'. Another game played with the plant in Britain and Ireland is a variation of conkers; a child tries to knock off the flowerhead of their friendly rival's stalk using their own stalk with a fast downward thrust. This pastime is known vernacularly as 'dongers' in Kent and 'Carl doddies' (along with the plant itself) in Scotland.

References

External links
Jepson Manual Treatment
Photo gallery
Buckhorn
Ribwort

Medicinal plants
lanceolata
Plants described in 1753
Taxa named by Carl Linnaeus
Flora of Malta